Belvidere is a town in Jackson County, South Dakota, United States. The population was 46 at the 2020 census.

History
A post office called Belvidere has been in operation since 1906. Belvidere was laid out in 1907, and named after Belvidere, Illinois, the native home of a share of the first settlers.

Geography
Belvidere is located at  (43.832243, -101.272285).

Belvidere has been assigned the ZIP code 57521, and the FIPS place code 04620. The town is located in southern South Dakota near Kadoka and east of Rapid City.

Demographics

2010 census
As of the census of 2010, there were 49 people, 23 households, and 12 families residing in the town. The racial makeup of the town was 85.7% White and 14.3% Native American. Hispanic or Latino of any race were 2.0% of the population.

There were 23 households, of which 26.1% had children under the age of 18 living with them, 34.8% were married couples living together, 8.7% had a female householder with no husband present, 8.7% had a male householder with no wife present, and 47.8% were non-families. 43.5% of all households were made up of individuals, and 17.4% had someone living alone who was 65 years of age or older. The average household size was 2.13 and the average family size was 3.00.

The median age in the town was 46.5 years. 22.4% of residents were under the age of 18; 6.2% were between the ages of 18 and 24; 18.3% were from 25 to 44; 30.7% were from 45 to 64; and 22.4% were 65 years of age or older. The gender makeup of the town was 51.0% male and 49.0% female.

2000 census
As of the census of 2000, there were 57 people, 26 households, and 15 families residing in the town. The population density was 67.4 people per square mile (25.9/km2). There were 37 housing units at an average density of 43.8 per square mile (16.8/km2). The racial makeup of the town was 82.46% White, and 17.54% Native American, and 0.00% of any other race.

There were 26 households, out of which 26.9% had children under the age of 18 living with them, 42.3% were married couples living together, 15.4% had a female householder with no husband present, and 38.5% were non-families. 38.5% of all households were made up of individuals, and 19.2% had someone living alone who was 65 years of age or older. The average household size was 2.19 and the average family size was 2.94.

In the town, the population was spread out, with 28.1% under the age of 18, 5.3% from 18 to 24, 12.3% from 25 to 44, 33.3% from 45 to 64, and 21.1% who were 65 years of age or older. The median age was 47 years. For every 100 females, there were 83.9 males. For every 100 females age 18 and over, there were 78.3 males.

As of 2000 the median income for a household in the town was $26,250, and the median income for a family was $39,375. Males had a median income of $28,750 versus $13,750 for females. The per capita income for the town was $14,575. 15.9% of the population and 15.8% of families were below the poverty line.  28.6% are under the age of 18. None of those 65 and older were living below the poverty line.

Notable people
 Tom Berry, the 14th Governor of South Dakota.

References

Towns in Jackson County, South Dakota
Towns in South Dakota